Vestvågøy is a municipality in Nordland county, Norway. It is part of the traditional district of Lofoten. The administrative centre of the municipality is the town of Leknes. Some of the villages in the municipality include Ballstad, Borg, Bøstad, Gravdal, Knutstad, Stamsund, and Tangstad. With over 11,300 inhabitants, Vestvågøy is the most populous municipality in all of the Lofoten and Vesterålen regions in Nordland county.

The  municipality is the 232nd largest by area out of the 356 municipalities in Norway. Vestvågøy is the 98th most populous municipality in Norway with a population of 11,566.

General information
The municipality of Vestvågøy was created on 1 January 1963 when the four municipalities on the island of Vestvågøya were merged into one municipality for the whole island. The old municipalities on the island were Borge (population: 4,056), Buksnes (population: 4,416), Hol (population: 3,154), and Valberg (population: 662). Initially, Vestvågøy had 12,288 residents. The borders have not changed since.

Name
The municipality is named after the island of Vestvågøya. Vestvågøy can be broken down into three parts: vest-våg-øy which can be roughly translated as west-bay-island.

Coat of arms
The coat of arms was granted on 7 September 1984. The official blazon is "Azure, two stockfish addorsed". This means the arms have a blue field (background) and the charge is two dried codfish (also known as stockfish. The fish have a tincture of argent which means they are commonly colored white, but if it is made out of metal, then silver is used. This was chosen since the municipality is one of the main Norwegian exporters of (dried) cod or stockfish and has been since the Middle Ages. The arms were designed by Kjell Kvivesen.

Churches
The Church of Norway has five parishes within the municipality of Vestvågøy. It is part of the Lofoten prosti (deanery) in the Diocese of Sør-Hålogaland.

Geography

Vestvågøy municipality is among the most scenic in Norway. It encompassed the whole island of Vestvågøya with the Norwegian Sea to the north and the Vestfjorden to the south. The island has rugged cliffs and peaks facing the southeastern coast. Towards the northwest, however, the land is flat, with extensive farmlands. Most people are found in the town of Leknes and in its "twin town" Gravdal, where Nordland Hospital is located. Along the southeastern coast, one finds picturesque fishing villages like Ballstad and Stamsund, where the Hurtigruten (coastal ferry) stops.

Uttakleiv the most romantic beach in Europe, according to the British newspaper The Times, and the neighbouring Hauklandsstranden is ranked by the Norwegian newspaper Dagbladet as the best beach in Norway.

In Leknes, the sun (midnight sun) is above the horizon from May 26 until July 17, and in winter the sun does not rise from December 9 until January 4. The midnight sun is best viewed from the western beaches, such as Uttakleiv and Eggum.

Climate
There is an official weather station at Leknes Airport. Autumn and winter is much wetter than spring and summer. The driest month (July) get less than one fift of the precipitation in the wettest month (December).

Government
All municipalities in Norway, including Vestvågøy, are responsible for primary education (through 10th grade), outpatient health services, senior citizen services, unemployment and other social services, zoning, economic development, and municipal roads. The municipality is governed by a municipal council of elected representatives, which in turn elect a mayor.  The municipality falls under the Lofoten District Court and the Hålogaland Court of Appeal.

Municipal council
The municipal council of Vestvågøy is made up of 33 representatives that are elected to four year terms. The party breakdown of the council is as follows:

Mayors
The mayors of Vestvågøy:

 1963-1963: Alsing Wik (H)
 1964–1967: Walter Tjønndal (Ap)
 1968–1969: Boy Rist (H)
 1970–1971: Karl Leirfall (Sp)
 1972–1973: Eivind Bolle (Ap)
 1974–1975: Johannes Sundrønning (Ap)
 1976–1977: Petter Limstrand (Sp)
 1978–1981: Johannes Sundrønning (Ap)
 1982–1983: Petter Limstrand (Sp)
 1984–1987: Søren Fredrik Voie (H)
 1988–1991: Karl Sverre Klevstad (KrF)
 1992–1999: Frank Rist (Sp)
 1999–2007: Guri Ingebrigtsen (Ap)
 2007–2015: Jonny Finstad (H)
 2015–present: Remi Solberg (Ap)

Transportation

Leknes is the trading and shopping centre of Lofoten, only rivaled by Svolvær. Leknes Airport is for smaller aircraft, with 7 daily scheduled flights to Bodø and some daily flights to Svolvær and Røst with Widerøe airlines. There is a small bus terminal which serves as a hub with bus links to the rest of Lofoten. The Leknes Havn (harbor) is one of Norway's most important and visited harbors for cruise ships.
Hurtigruten has been an important means of communication for a century. It docks in Stamsund twice every night, one heading south towards Bodø the other heading north towards Svolvær.

The European route E10 highway crosses the municipality (and island) with the Sundklakkstraumen Bridge connecting to Vågan in the north and the Nappstraumen Tunnel connecting to Flakstad in the south.

International relations

Twin towns – Sister cities
Vestvågøy is twinned with:

 Skeiða- og Gnúpverjahreppur, Iceland

Notable residents

 Hartvig Jentoft (1693 in Borge – 1739) a Norwegian tradesman and sailor
 Karl Uchermann (1855 in Borge – 1940) a Norwegian painter of dogs and altarpieces
 Mikael Heggelund Foslie (1855 in Borge – 1909) a botanist and algaeologist
 Jens R. Nilssen (1880 in Valberg – 1964) a Norwegian illustrator, comics creator and cartoonist
 Edvarda Lie (1910–1963) a painter, drawer and illustrator; brought up in Vestvågøy
 Boy Rist (1912 in Gravdal – 1972) a naval officer, member of the Norwegian resistance in WWII
 Harald Sverdrup (1923 in Gravdal – 1992) a Norwegian poet and children's writer
 Kari Wærness (born 1939 in Leknes) a Norwegian sociologist
 Søren Fredrik Voie (born 1949 in Vestvågøy) a politician, Mayor of Vestvågøy 1983-1987
 Guri Ingebrigtsen (1952–2020) a Norwegian politician; Mayor of Vestvågøy 1999 to 2007
 Rahim Aga Khan (born 1971) son of Prince Karim Aga Khan, bought a house in Unstad in 2019

Media gallery

References

External links

Municipal fact sheet from Statistics Norway 

 
Municipalities of Nordland
Populated places of Arctic Norway
1963 establishments in Norway